"The Triumph of Hope Over Experience" is an album by Robb Johnson released in 2002.

Track listing
All tracks composed by Robb Johnson
"Passport, Tickets and Guitar" – 5:03
"One Broadstairs Morning" – 4:10
"Life is Football" – 4:49
"When the Swing Began to Swing" – 3:42
"Soho Heart" – 6:20
"Happy Birthday, General" – 3:39
"Supporting Chumbawamba" – 5:22
"London on Sea" – 5:01
"This Song is a Rose" – 5:34
"Hope Street, Tomorrow Afternoon" – 4:29
"You and This City" – 4:58
"Sunlight and Snow" – 5:04
bonus track – 1:51

Personnel

Musicians
Robb Johnson - vocals, guitar
Barb Jungr - vocals (tracks 5, 10–11)
Mauricio Venegas-Astorga - vocals (track 6), guitar (track 11), flute (track 6), panpipes (track 6), percussion (track 3)
Miranda Sykes - vocals (tracks 2–3, 8–10), bass guitar (tracks 2–3, 9–11), double bass (tracks 1, 5, 8, 12)
Russell Churney - piano (tracks 2, 5, 8, 11)
John Sykes - vocals (track 2), melodeon (track 2)
Rachel Pantin - violin (track 8)
Saskia Tomkins - violin (tracks 1, 4, 9–10)
Paul Mullineaux - drums (tracks 1–2, 9–11)
"The Evening Star" - vocals (track 3)

Other personnel
Robb Johnson - design, photography
Meeta Johnson - photography
Tony Warren - design

References

External links
Robb Johnson Official website

2002 albums
Robb Johnson albums